Be Yourself! is a 1930 American Pre-Code musical comedy film directed by Thornton Freeland and starring Fanny Brice and Robert Armstrong.  The plot involves an entertainer (Brice) managing a boxer (Armstrong).  The cinematographer was Karl Struss and the running time is 65 minutes.

Cast
Fanny Brice as Fannie Field
Robert Armstrong as Jerry Moore
Harry Green as Harry Field
G. Pat Collins as "Mac" McCloskey
Gertrude Astor as Lillian Thorpe
Budd Fine as Step
Marjorie Kane as Lola, chorus girl
Rita Flynn as Jessica

References

External links

Be Yourself! in The New York Times

1930 films
1930 musical comedy films
American musical comedy films
American black-and-white films
Films directed by Thornton Freeland
United Artists films
1930s English-language films
1930s American films